Password: Kill Agent Gordon is a 1966 Spanish-Italian Eurospy film  directed by Sergio Grieco and starring  Roger Browne.

Cast 

 Roger Browne as  Doug Gordon
 Helga Liné as Karin
 Miguel de la Riva as Rudy Schwartz  
 Franco Ressel as Albert Kowalski / Kastiadis
 Rosalba Neri as Amalia
 Andrea Scotti as Walter
 Silvana Jachino as Aisha 
 Mila Stanic as Magda 
 Enzo Andronico as Monsieur Lapipi

References

External links

1966 films
Italian spy thriller films
Spanish spy thriller films
1960s spy thriller films
Films directed by Sergio Grieco
Films scored by Piero Umiliani
1960s Italian films
1960s Spanish films